Canada competed in the 2019 Pan American Games in Lima, Peru from July 26 to August 11, 2019.

In November 2018, two time Olympian in rowing Douglas Vandor was named as the team's chef de mission.

On July 23, 2019, it as announced that field hockey team captain Scott Tupper would be the country's flag bearer during the opening ceremony. After winning five medals for a second straight games, artistic gymnast Ellie Black was named as the country's flag bearer during the closing ceremony.

Canadian athletes competed in 35 of 39 sports, with the exceptions being basque pelota, bodybuilding, football and roller sports.

Competitors
The following is the list of number of competitors (per gender) participating at the games per sport/discipline.

Medallists

|  style="text-align:left; vertical-align:top;"|

|align=left|
| width="22%" align="left" valign="top" |

Archery

The Canadian archery team consisted of seven athletes (three men and four women). At the first qualifier, Canada won three quota spots (one each in men's and women's recurve and an additional spot in women's compound). Canada later qualified a full men's and women's recurve team at the final qualification tournament. The team was officially named on June 19, 2019.

Men

Women

Mixed

Artistic swimming

Canada qualified a team of nine athletes automatically, as being the only member as part of zone four. The team was officially named on June 4, 2019.

Women

Catherine Barrett was the reserve swimmer.

Athletics (track and field)

Canada's athletics (track and field) team of 44 athletes (18 men and 26 women) was named on June 26, 2019.

Key
Note–Ranks given for track events are for the entire round
Q = Qualified for the next round
q = Qualified for the next round as a fastest loser or, in field events, by position without achieving the qualifying target
NR = National record
GR = Games record
PB = Personal best
DNF = Did not finish
NM = No mark
N/A = Round not applicable for the event
Bye = Athlete not required to compete in round

Men
Track and road events

Field events

Combined events – Decathlon

Women
Track and road events

Field events

Badminton

Canada qualified a full team of eight badminton athletes. The team was officially named on June 12, 2019.

Singles

Doubles

Baseball

Canada qualified a men's team of 24 athletes by finishing in the top four at the 2019 Pan American Games Qualifier in Brazil.

Roster
Canada's roster of 24 athletes was officially named on June 25, 2019.

Ben Abram (P)
Phillippe Aumont (P)
Jordan Balazovic (P)
Eric Cerantola (P)
Michael Crouse (OF)
Wes Darvill (INF)
RJ Freure (P)
Tyson Gillies (OF)
Dustin Houle (C)
Edouard Julien (INF)
Ryan Kellogg (P)
Jordan Lennerton (INF)
Chris Leroux (P)
Adam Loewen (P)
Jonathan Malo (INF)
Dustin Molleken (P)
Connor Panas (OF)
Tristan Pompey (OF
Jordan Procyshen (C)
Jasvir Rakkar (P)
Scott Richmond (P)
Evan Rutckyj (P)
Rene Tosoni (OF)
Eric Wood (INF)

Legend: C = Catcher • INF = Infielder • OF = Outfielder • P = Pitcher

Group B

Super round

Gold medal match

Basketball

Canada qualified a women's team (of 12 athletes) by winning the 2017 FIBA Women's AmeriCup. The team entered was a developmental team, using this event to gain international experience.

Women's tournament

Roster
Canada's roster of 12 athletes was officially named on June 28, 2019.

Hailey Brown (F)
Cassandra Brown (F)
Hanna Hall (G)
Ruth Hamblin (C)
Samantha Hill (G)
Alyssa Jerome (F)
Alex Kiss-Rusk (C)
Aislinn Konig (G)
Ceejay Nofuente (G)
Shaina Pellington (G)
Emily Potter (C)
Jamie Scott (G)

Legend: C = Centre • F = Forward • G = Guard 
Group A

Fifth place match

Beach volleyball

Canada qualified the maximum of four beach volleyball athletes (two men and two women). The team was officially named on June 26, 2019.

Women's team shows placement round matches.

Bowling

Canada qualified two women by finishing in the top two at the 2018 PABCON Female Championship. Canada later qualified two men by finishing among the top five at the PABCON Champion of Champions. The four member team was officially announced on April 9, 2019.

Singles

Doubles

Boxing

Canada qualified six boxers (two men and four women). The official team was announced on May 15, 2019.

Tammara Thiebault was upgraded to a silver medal (from bronze) in November 2020 after the doping disqualification of the gold medallist.

Canoeing

Slalom
Canada qualified a total of four slalom athletes (two men and two women). The team was officially named on June 27, 2019, the team was considered as developmental team.

Slalom

Extreme

Sprint
Canada qualified a full team of 16 athletes in canoe sprint (eight per gender). However, the official team only had 14 athletes (seven men and seven women). The team was officially named on June 27, 2019, the team was considered as developmental team.

Men

Women

Qualification Legend: F = Qualify to final (medal); SF = Qualify to semifinal. Position is within the heat

Cycling

Canada qualified 12 cyclists (four men and eight women). The defending champion in both events, Canada, decided not to compete in mountain biking after the Pan American Championships date was changed at the last minute. After a highly successful games in 2015 on home soil, where Canada topped the cycling medal table with 20 medals, Cycling Canada decided to shift its focus to the next generation of athletes and named a team of developmental athletes. Canada originally qualified 21 cyclists, but only 13 were named to the team, later dropping to 12 after BMX racer Alex Tougas withdrew. The team was officially named on June 26, 2019.

Road
All road athletes will also compete in track cycling.

Women

Track
Men
Joel Archambault
Nick Wammes

Women
Erin Attwell
Miriam Brouwer
Maggie Coles-Lyster
Laurie Jussaume
Kelsey Mitchell
Amelia Walsh

BMX
Freestyle

Racing

Diving

Canada qualified a full team of eight divers (four per gender). The team was officially announced on June 12, 2019.

Men

Women

Equestrian

Canada qualified a full team of 12 equestrians (four per discipline). The team of 12 athletes (two men and ten women) was named on June 19, 2019.

Dressage

Eventing

Jumping

Fencing

Canada qualified a full team of 18 fencers (nine men and nine women). The team was announced officially on June 7, 2019.

Individual
Men

Women

Team

Fencers listed in italics were the substitute.

Field hockey

Canada qualified a men's and women's team (of 16 athletes each, for a total of 32) by being ranked among the top three unqualified nations from the 2017 Men's Pan American Cup and 2017 Women's Pan American Cup respectively.

Men's tournament

Roster

Preliminary round

Quarterfinals

Semifinals

Gold medal match

Women's tournament

Roster

Preliminary round

Quarterfinals

Semifinals

Gold medal match

Golf

Canada qualified a full team of four golfers (two men and two women). The team was officially announced on May 28, 2019.

Gymnastics

Canada qualified a full gymnastics team of 21 gymnasts (seven men and 14 women). The team was officially named on June 17, 2019.

Artistic
Canada qualified a full team of ten gymnasts (five men and five women).

Men
Team & Individual Qualification

Women
Team & Individual Qualification

Individual finals

Rhythmic
Canada qualified a full team of seven gymnasts (two individuals and a group of five).
Individual

Individual finals

Group

Trampoline
Canada qualified a full team of four gymnasts in trampoline (two per gender).

Handball

Canada qualified a women's team (of 14 athletes) by winning the final qualification tournament.

Women's tournament

Roster
Canada's roster of 14 athletes was officially named on June 3, 2019.

Vassilia Gagnon
Camilia Pivin
Alexandra Pivin
Audrey Marcoux
Myriam Laplante
Nassima Benhacine
Myriam Zimmer
Émily Routhier
Catherine Léger
Samantha Koosau
Rosali Langlois
Yuki Landry
Katya Chan
Haven Wong

Group A

Classification round

Seventh place match

Judo

Canada entered a total of seven judoka into the competition, declining a few quotas earned. The team was officially named on July 12, 2019 and was considered as a developmental team as many of the country's top judoka were not named to the team.

Men

Women

Karate

Canada qualified four karatekas (one man and three women). The team was officially named on June 13, 2019.

Kata
Women

Kumite

Modern pentathlon

Canada qualified a team of five modern pentathletes (two men and three women). The team was officially named on June 27, 2019.

Individual

Relay

Racquetball

Canada qualified four racquetball athletes (two men and two women). The team was officially named on June 20, 2019.

Men

Women

Rowing

Canada qualified 13 rowers (five men and eight women). After winning eight gold medals at the last games on home soil, Rowing Canada decided to send a developmental team to these games. The team was officially named on June 25, 2019.

Men

Women

Rugby sevens

Canada qualified a men's and women's team (of 12 athletes each) automatically.

Men's tournament

Roster
Canada's roster of 12 athletes was officially named on July 16, 2019. The team was a mix of national team players and younger players looking to gain experience.

Phil Berna
Cooper Coats
Admir Cejvanovic
Sean Duke
Nathan Hirayama
Harry Jones
Isaac Kaay
Patrick Kay
Luke McCloskey
Josiah Morra
Brennig Prevost
Adam Zaruba

Pool stage

Semifinal

Final

Women's tournament

Roster
Canada's roster of 12 athletes was officially named on July 16, 2019. The team was a mix of national team players and younger players looking to gain experience.

Delaney Aikens
Pam Buisa
Emma Chown
Caroline Crossley
Olivia De Couverer
Asia Hogan-Rochester
Sara Kaljuvee
Tausani Levale
Kaili Lukan
Kayla Moleschi
Breanne Nicholas
Temitiope Ogunjimi

Pool stage

Semifinal

Gold medal match

Sailing

Canada qualified nine boats and 14 sailors. Canada's team of 14 sailors (eight men and six women) was announced on June 18, 2019.

Men & Women's events

RDG=Redress given

Open & Mixed 

DNS=Did not start, STP=Standard penalty

Shooting

Canada qualified 18 sport shooters (11 men and seven women). The team was officially named on June 20, 2019. Canada swapped a quota in women's rifle to men's rifle after quota allocation. 

Men

Women

Mixed

Squash

Canada qualified a full squash team of six athletes (three men and three women). The team was officially named on May 14, 2019.

Singles and Doubles 

Team

Softball

Canada qualified a women's team (of 15 athletes) by being ranked in the top five nations at the 2017 Pan American Championships. The men's team which has won every single gold medal awarded at the Pan American Games failed to qualify.

Women's tournament

Roster

Natalie Wideman
Erika Polidori
Joanne Lye
Holly Speers
Jennifer Salling
Victoria Hayward
Janet Leung
Danielle Lawrie
Sara Groenewegen
Emma Entzminger
Jennifer Gilbert
Larissa Franklin
Eujenna Caira
Kaleigh Rafter
Morgan Rackel

Preliminary round

Semifinals

Grand final

Swimming

Canada entered a total of 20 swimmers (four men and 16 women). The team is considered as a B team, full of swimmers who are up and coming and did not qualify for the 2019 World Aquatics Championships. Canada's open water swimmers were selected after the 2019 Canadian Open Water Swimming Trials held in the Cayman Islands. The winner of each event and the highest ranked swimmer born between 1999 and 2005 qualified for each respective event. Mabel Zavaros was later replaced with swimmer Mackenzie Glover.

Men

Women

Swimmers in italics swam in the preliminaries only and received medals.

Mixed

Swimmers in italics swam in the preliminaries only and received medals (if medaled).

Surfing

Canada qualified seven surfers (three men and four women) in the sport's debut at the Pan American Games. The team was officially named on June 7, 2019.

Artistic

Race

Table tennis

Canada qualified a full table tennis team of six athletes (three men and three women). The team was officially named on July 15, 2019.

Singles and Doubles

Teams

Taekwondo

Canada qualified a full team of 13 athletes in taekwondo (eight in kyorugi and five in poomsae). The team was officially named on June 11, 2019.

Kyorugi
Men

Women

Poomsae

Tennis

Canada qualified three female tennis athletes. The team was officially named on July 15, 2019.

Women

Triathlon

Canada qualified a full triathlon team of six athletes (three men and three women). The team was officially named on May 29, 2019. Triathlon Canada is using the event as an opportunity for development and is sending a group of young athletes to gain exposure and experience.

Mixed Relay

Volleyball

Canada qualified a women's team (of 12 athletes) by winning the bronze medal at the 2018 Women's Pan-American Volleyball Cup.

Women's tournament

Roster
Canada's roster of 12 athletes was officially named on July 18, 2019. The team was a mix of national team players and younger players looking to gain experience.

Brianna Beamish
Megan Beedie
Megan Cyr
Sarah Chase
Hilary Howe
Sara Kovac
Kristen Moncks
Alicia Ogoms
Kim Robitaille
Lauren Sproule
Layne Van Buskirk
Jazmine White

Group A

Seventh place match

Water polo

Canada qualified a men's and women's team (of 11 athletes each) automatically as being the only members of zone 4.

Men's tournament

Roster
Canada's roster of 11 athletes was officially named on July 5, 2019.

 Nicolas Constantin-Bicari
 Jérémie Côté
 Bogdan Djerkovic
 Reuel D’Souza
 Aleksa Gardijan
 Matthew Halajian
 Gaelan Patterso
 Milan Radenovic
 Aria Soleimanipak
 Mark Spooner
 George Torakis

Group A

Quarterfinals

Semifinals

Gold medal match

Women's tournament

Roster
Canada's roster of 11 athletes was officially named on July 5, 2019.

Krystina Alogbo
Joelle Bekhazi
Kyra Christmas
Monika Eggens
Shae Fournier
Jessica Gaudreault
Elyse Lemay-Lavoie
Kelly McKee
Hayley McKelvey
Kindred Paul
Emma Wright

Group B

Quarterfinals

Semifinals

Gold medal match

Water skiing

Canada qualified a full team of six water skiers and wakerboarders (three per gender). The team as officially named on July 19, 2019.

Waterski and Wakeboard

Overall

Weightlifting

Canada qualified four weightlifters (one man and three women). The team as officially named on July 18, 2019.

Wrestling

Canada qualified a team of 11 wrestlers (seven men and four women). The team was officially named on May 31, 2019. Jade Parsons replaced Diana Weicker, five days before the competition.

Men's freestyle

Greco-Roman

Women's freestyle

See also
Canada at the 2019 Parapan American Games
Canada at the 2020 Summer Olympics

References

Nations at the 2019 Pan American Games
2019
2019 in Canadian sports